Onchidoris lactea is a species of sea slug, a dorid nudibranch, a shell-less marine gastropod mollusc in the family Onchidorididae.

Distribution
This species was described from Bay Island, Bailey's Bay, Bermuda. Additional specimens were described in 1901.

References

Onchidorididae
Gastropods described in 1900